The Man Who Shot the Albatross is a play by Ray Lawler about the Rum Rebellion, first performed in 1971. A 1972 television film featured the stage cast.

Cast
Leo McKern as Captain Bligh
Michael Aitkens
John Ewart
Gary Day
Peter Norton		
John Orcsik
Frank Thring
Simon Chilvers
Patricia Kennedy
Malcolm Phillips

Production
Ray Lawler's play premiered at the Princess Theatre for the Melbourne Theatre Company in 1971 and was directed by John Sumner. It marked Leo McKern's return to Australia after a number of years away. It was Lawler's first play produced in Australia for a number of years. The production toured around Australia.

References

External links

1972 television films
1972 films
1970s English-language films